Dan St. Marseille (born 1962) is an American clarinetist and saxophonist.

St. Marseille has had recordings profiled in subject of articles in Down Beat, Jazztimes, Los Angeles Times, and Jazz Critic. He headlined at the Coleman Hawkins Festival in Topeka. He was inducted into the Saddleback Valley School Districts Hall Of Fame in 1999. He has a teaching studio in Southern California. He also leads the Dan St. Marseille Quartet.

St. Marseille is a Yamaha performing artist. He plays on a TS-875 saxophone and YCL-681II and YCL-CSV clarinet.

References

External links
St. Marseille's website

American clarinetists
1962 births
Living people
21st-century American saxophonists
21st-century clarinetists
21st-century American male musicians